Sal (Portuguese for "salt") is an island in Cape Verde. Sal is a tourist destination with white sandy beaches and over 350 days of sunshine a year. Cabo Verde is known for  year-round kiteboarding, for the large reserve of Caretta turtles which hatch from July to September, and the music of Cesaria Evora.

History 
For Europeans , the island was discovered on 3 December 1460 and named Llana ("flat"). This name was changed into the current "Sal" when the two large salt ponds (Pedra de Lume and Santa Maria) were discovered. The first three centuries after its discovery, the island was only sparsely inhabited; in 1720 there was a small fishing village near present Palmeira. This changed when the salt industry was developed at the end of the 18th century, starting in Pedra de Lume. Santa Maria was founded in the south of the island in 1830 by Manuel António Martins. During this time the salt industry thrived, with 30,000 tons of salt being exported in the early years. Most of the salt was exported to Brazil until its nationalization in 1887, Portuguese and French salt investors resumed salt production until 1984.

In 1939 Italy started constructing an airport to receive flights from Europe and South America. Construction was halted and ceased around World War II. The Portuguese bought the airport from the Italians and finished it in 1949. Northeast of the airport, workers from São Nicolau Island settled in a village named Preguiça, now part of Espargos. Hurricane Fred struck the island of Sal in late summer 2015, causing damage to houses, tourist facilities and ships.

Geography 
The island is 29.7 km long and 11.8 km wide. It is one of the three sandy eastern islands (Sal, Boa Vista and Maio) of the archipelago, with white sandy beaches. The island is fairly flat; its highest point is Monte Grande, at 406 m elevation. The uninhabited islet Ilhéu Rabo de Junco lies near the west coast of Sal. Saline marshes can be found in the Pedra de Lume crater and north of Santa Maria.

Climate 
Sal Island has on average 350 days of sunshine a year. Winds mainly blow from the northeast. However, some days do also have clouds, but they tend to be scattered and seldom bring rain. The 'rainy season' is from July to mid-October, although rainfall is still low.

Municipality

Administratively, the island of Sal is covered by one municipality, Concelho do Sal. This municipality consists of one freguesia (civil parish), Nossa Senhora das Dores, which also covers the whole island. The municipality of Sal was created in 1935, when it was separated from the Municipality of Boa Vista. The municipal seat was originally at Santa Maria, but Espargos became the municipal seat in the 1970s.

The freguesia is subdivided into the following settlements:
 Espargos (city)
 Murdeira
 Palmeira (town)
 Pedra de Lume
 Santa Maria (city)
 Terra Boa

Politics
Since 2016, the Movement for Democracy (MpD) is the ruling party of the municipality. The results of the latest elections, in 2016:

Demographics

As of 1832, the population was estimated at 400 people. Until 1960, it was the least populous island of the nine inhabited islands of Cape Verde, with less than 3,000 inhabitants. Since then the population has been growing rapidly, reaching around 40,000 in 2019, which makes it the third most populous island in Cape Verde, after Santiago and São Vicente, and having overtaken Santo Antão and Fogo.

Economy 
Sal's main town, Espargos, is home to one of the nation's international airports. Tourism, focused on the area of Santa Maria, has replaced salt and fishing as the main source of income. In 2017, 48.2% of the country's available beds were on the island of Sal. The living standards on the island are among the best in the Cape Verde archipelago. The island's GDP per capita as of 2015 is 495,827 escudos (4,497 euro).

Infrastructure 

The island is home to Amílcar Cabral International Airport, the busiest airport of Cape Verde. The main port of the island of Sal is at Palmeira. The main roads are:
Santa Maria - Espargos Road (EN1-SL01)
Palmeira - Espargos Road (EN1-SL02)

Sports

Football (soccer) is the chief sports on the island. It has the Sal Regional Football Association and its main competitions are the Premier and the Second Divisions. Its main clubs are Académica do Sal, Académico do Aeroporto, Juventude and SC Santa Maria. The island's main stadium is Estádio Marcelo Leitão situated southeast of Espargos's center and all regional matches are played.  Also Basketball is the second most popular on the island as well as volleyball, they are played at Polidesportivo do Sal, Académico do Sal is the island's best basketball team. Futsal is also played.  Also dominant particularly in the beaches the south of the island and its surrounding waters are surfing, windsurfing and kitesurfing, recently gained for about 25 years and becoming the most dominant in the nation in windsurfing and kitesurfing.

Twin towns - Sister cities
Sal is twinned with:
 Cascais, Portugal
 Desenzano del Garda, Italy
 Grottammare, Italy
 South Normanton, England

Notable residents 
 Maria Alice, singer
 Carlos Andrade, basketball player
 Rodirlei José Ascensão Duarte (Rody), footballer 
 Elvis Évora (Elvis), footballer
 Ana Firmino, singer
 Hermínia da Cruz Fortes, singer
 Ildo Lobo, musician 
 Mirri Lobo, musician
 Ildo Augusto Dos Santos Lopes Fortes, current bishop of Mindelo
 4BGSal Islands, artist
 Nelson Marcos, soccer player
 Basílio Ramos, politician
 Héldon Ramos (Héldon), footballer
 Ruben Sança, athlete
 Dona Tututa, composer and pianist

Gallery

See also

 Wildlife of Cape Verde

References

External links

Official website of the Municipality of Sal
 Information on Sal
 The Salt flats at Pedra de Lume

 
Islands of Cape Verde
Municipalities of Cape Verde
1930s establishments in Cape Verde